Urdu Academy, Bihar is a governmental organisation and institute based in Patna, the capital city of the Indian state of Bihar. It was established in 1972, and aims to promote the use of Urdu language within the state. As well as they provide diploma and various other courses degrees.

Publications
 Zaban-o-Adab is a monthly magazine published by the academy in the Urdu language.

Officers
 Chairman - Nitish Kumar, Chief Minister of Bihar
 Academy President - Khurshid Ahmed, MLA from West Champaran
 Secretary - Azimullah Ansari

References

Organisations based in Bihar
Linguistic research institutes in India
Urdu Academies in India
1972 establishments in Bihar